The World Scrabble Championship 2001 was the sixth World Scrabble Championship. The winner was Brian Cappelletto of the United States.

The event took place at The Venetian on the Las Vegas Strip, USA. The eighty-eight players played eight games on each of the first three days, in a Swiss tournament. As usual, the top two players then competed in a best-of-five final to decide who would become world champion.

Results
After the Swiss tournament, the top two players were Brian Cappelletto representing the United States, with 18 wins and winning spread of +921, and Joel Wapnick, defending champion from 1999, with 17 wins and winning spread +1006. These two players thus contested the final.

In the first game of the final, Wapnick played first. Both players began by changing tiles, then exchanged straightforward bingos (ANALYSE and IRATELY respectively). Further highlights included Wapnick's WHEEP and BAJU and Cappelletto's INDUSIA. In the final move, trailing 482-464 and with only the O remaining on his rack, Cappelletto needed to score 16 points to force a draw. Unfortunately for him, there was no such move available and, while he played the best available move (ZO for 13), Wapnick took the game 482-479.

The second game was less high-scoring, with only two bonuses; Wapnick's DRESSING and CONDOLER. Despite this, Cappelletto won the game 410-372 to level the match at 1-1.

In the third game, Wapnick began the game with a bonus (LOURINg for 64), but Cappelletto won a claustrophobic game 400-352, and lead the match 2-1. Notably, he finished with just six seconds left, and his opponent had only four seconds remaining.

The fourth game proved decisive, as Cappelletto again won by a comfortable margin, 444 to 338.

By three games to one, Brian Cappelletto was declared World Scrabble Champion 2001.

Complete Results

FINALS:
Game 1: Wapnick 482 – Cappelletto 479
Game 2: Cappelletto 410 – Wapnick 372
Game 3: Cappelletto 400 – Wapnick 352
Game 4: Cappelletto 444 – Wapnick 338

References 

2001
2001 in the United States
2001 in American sports
2001 in sports in Nevada
21st century in Las Vegas